Florent Ribet (born  in Grenoble) is a French bobsledder.

Ribet competed at the 2014 Winter Olympics for France. He teamed with driver Loïc Costerg, Romain Heinrich and Elly Lefort in the France-1 sled in the four-man event, finishing 17th.

Ribet made his World Cup debut in December 2013. As of April 2014, his best finish is 20th, in four events in 2013-14.

References

1989 births
Living people
Olympic bobsledders of France
Sportspeople from Grenoble
Bobsledders at the 2014 Winter Olympics
French male bobsledders